A list of films produced by the Marathi language film industry based in Maharashtra in the year 2003.

2003 Releases
A list of Marathi films released in 2003.

References

Lists of 2003 films by country or language
 Marathi
2003